Ann(e) Hanson or Hansen may refer to:
Ann Meekitjuk Hanson (born 1946), Commissioner of Nunavut
Ann-Louise Hanson (born 1944), Swedish singer
Ann Ellis Hanson, American papyrologist and historian
Anne Coffin Hanson (1921–2004), American art historian
Ann Hansen (born 1953), Canadian anarchist
Anne Lena Hansen (born 1974), Norwegian model

See also
Anne Hanson Dorsey